The Piura chat-tyrant (Ochthoeca piurae) is a species of bird in the family Tyrannidae. It is endemic to Peru.

Its natural habitat is subtropical or tropical high-altitude shrubland. It is threatened by habitat loss.

References

Piura chat-tyrant
Birds of the Peruvian Andes
Endemic birds of Peru
Piura chat-tyrant
Taxonomy articles created by Polbot